The 1216 papal election (18 July), was convoked after the death of Pope Innocent III in Perugia (16 July 1216), elected Cardinal Cencio Camerario, who took the name of Honorius III.

List of participants

There were 25 cardinals in the College of Cardinals in July 1216, including 23 curial cardinals and two "external cardinals", who did not reside in the papal curia It is known that 17 of them participated in the election:

Absentee cardinals

Eight cardinals, including six curial and two "external cardinals", were absent:

Election of Pope Honorius III

The cardinals assembled in Perugia two days after the death of Innocent III. They deliberated in the enclosure, though it is not certain whether voluntarily or under pressure of the local authorities. They decided to elect the new Pope by compromissum, it means, not by the whole Sacred College, but by the committee of few of them, empowered by the rest to appoint the new Pontiff. This time the committee included only two cardinal-bishops: Ugolino of Ostia and Guido of Palestrina. On that same day, they elected Cardinal Cencio, called Camerario, aged 68, who accepted his election and took the name of Honorius III.

Notes

Sources

 Werner Maleczek, Papst und Kardinalskolleg von 1191 bis 1216, Wien 1984
 Konrad Eubel, Hierarchia Catholica Medii Aevi, volumen I, 1913
 F. Bourkle-Young: notes to the papal election of 1216
 Vatican history

1216
13th-century elections
1216
13th-century Catholicism
1216 in Europe